Anderson Avenue station is a SEPTA Route 101 trolley stop in Drexel Hill, Pennsylvania. It is officially located near Anderson & Woodland Avenues, though the actual location is on Anderson Avenue south of Woodland Avenue.

Trolleys arriving at this station travel between 69th Street Terminal in Upper Darby, Pennsylvania and Orange Street in Media, Pennsylvania. Anderson Avenue is a dead end street at this station which contains platforms on both sides of the tracks. The other platform is located across the tracks behind the parking lot of a group of condominiums on Valley Road. The station has a white and green stucco shed with a roof where people can go inside when it is raining, but it is on the side with the condominiums.

References

External links

SEPTA Media–Sharon Hill Line stations